Abdulla Anwar (Arabic:عبد الله أنور) (born 2 June 1999) is an Emirati footballer. He currently plays as a forward for Al-Nasr.

Career
Abdulla Anwar started his career at Al-Wahda and is a product of the Al-Wahda's youth system. On 2 September 2019, Anwar Hattrick scored in Sharjah in the Arabian Gulf Cup . On 19 October 2019, Anwar made his professional debut for Al-Wahda against Al-Nasr in the Pro League, replacing Ismail Matar .

References

External links
 

1999 births
Living people
Emirati footballers
Olympic footballers of the United Arab Emirates
Al Wahda FC players
Al-Nasr SC (Dubai) players
UAE Pro League players
Association football forwards
Place of birth missing (living people)